Vyacheslav Alexandrovich Kislitsyn (born 1948) is a Russian politician who served as President of Mari El in 1997–2001. During his presidency, he was responsible for much of the economic development in Mari El. At the same time, he was criticised for his autocratic ideology, accused of supporting Chechen rebels, and his supposed 'cult of personality'. In the 2001 elections, he suffered a tight defeat against his opponent Leonid Markelov, where Kislitsyn received 25% of the vote. Since then, his political whereabouts are left unknown.

Biography 
Kislitsyn was born in 1948 in the Mari ASSR of the Soviet Union. Prior to serving in the Soviet Army, he was trained as mechanic in a specialized vocational school in Tomsk. He graduated from the Tomsk Railway College. After serving in the Army from 1971, he worked as the chairman of the District Committee for Physical Culture and Sports, the instructor of the Executive Committee Medvedevsky District Council. In 1978 he graduated from the Faculty of History, Mari State Pedagogical Institute. He 
began his political career during the Soviet Union, where he eventually became President of Mari El. Kislitsyn is married, and he has one daughter.

References 

Biography

1948 births
Living people
People from Mari El
Mari people
Heads of Mari El